Jochen Ott  (9 May 1974 in Porz) is a German teacher and politician of the Social Democrats (SPD) who has been serving as member of the Landtag of North Rhine-Westphalia since 2010.

Political career
From 2011 until 2019, Ott served as the leader of the party in Cologne. In 2015, he unsuccessfully ran to become Mayor of Cologne; he eventually suspended his mayoral election campaign in 2015 after the stabbing of his main rival Henriette Reker.

In parliament, Ott serves on the Committee on Education.

Other activities

Corporate boards
NRW.BANK, Member of the Advisory Board (since 2018)
Cologne Bonn Airport, Deputy Chairman of the Supervisory Board
RheinCargo, Member of the Supervisory Board

Non-profit organization
Westdeutscher Rundfunk (WDR), Alternate Member of the Broadcasting Council
Education and Science Workers' Union (GEW), Member

References

External links 

Social Democratic Party of Germany politicians
Living people
1974 births